The Movement for Change and Prosperity (MCAP) is a political party in Montserrat.

History
The party was established in 2005 as a successor to the National Progressive Party. In the 2006 elections it received 36.1% of the vote, winning four seats. Although it was the largest party in the Legislative Council, a coalition government was formed by the Montserrat Democratic Party (MDP), the New People's Liberation Movement (NPLM) and an independent MP.

In the 2009 elections the MCAP won six of the nine seats, with its then leader Reuben Meade becoming Chief Minister. However, the 2014 elections saw the party reduced to two seats.

In 2019 elections the MCAP won five out of nine seats, with its new leader Easton Taylor Farrell becoming the new Premier.

References

External links
Official website

Political parties in Montserrat
Political parties established in 2005
2005 establishments in Montserrat